Cantelli is an Italian surname. Notable people with the surname include:

Claudio Cantelli (born 1989), Brazilian racing driver
Francesco Paolo Cantelli (1875–1966), Italian mathematician
Guido Cantelli (1920–1956), Italian conductor
Ugo Cantelli (1903–1972), Italian sport shooter

Italian-language surnames